Slependen Station is a railway station on the Drammen Line located at Slependen in Bærum, Norway. Situated  from Oslo Central Station, it consists of an island platform and serves the L1 line of the Oslo Commuter Rail operated by Vy. It had 900 daily passengers in 2008.

The first station at Slependen was located  further west and opened on 11 September 1873, a year after the Drammen Line. It was variously known as Slæbenden and Slæbende until it took its present name in 1921. A new station building was erected in 1916 and demolished in 1960. With the doubling of the Drammen Line, Slependen was rebuilt  to the east, still on a curve, as an elevated station. This station was designed by Ina Backer. That station and the one to the east, Jong Station, were closed on 23 May 1993 and replaced by the current station, designed by Arne Henriksen.

History
The Drammen Line through Slependen opened as a narrow gauge railway on 7 October 1872. The area was at first served by Sandvika Station, but the station, initially known as Slæbenden, was opened on 11 September 1873. A year later the name was changed to Slæbende, from April 1894 as Slæbenden and received its current name in April 1921. The second station, at the same location, opened in 1916. It was demolished in 1960.

The third station at Slependen was constructed as part of the double-tracking of the Drammen Line between Sandvika and Asker. As the first of four phases, the double track past Slependen opened on 9 November 1958. Along with Billingstad Station and Hvalstad Station, Slependen was built as an elevated station. Designed by Ina Becker of NSB Arkitektkontor, it receive an island platform and was built over a road, from where the access to the station came. The station building filled the entire width of the platform and was therefore located at the end. Like the original location, Slependen was located in a curve, resulting in a cuneate shape. The polished concrete building featured a flat roof and slate cornice. The new station was situated  further Sandvika than the first two stations. Jong Station, situated between Slependen and Sandvika, opened in 1959. From that year Slependen Post Office moved into the station, where it remained until 1993.

By the late 1980s both Slependen and Jong Stations were in poor shape and in need for modernization. NSB had just ordered new center cars for their Class 69 commuter trains and a double set would therefore exceed the platform length. Both stations were located in curves. This was estimated to cost 8.4 million Norwegian krone in 1986. This involved moving the station  towards Sandvika. The new station, designed by Arne Henriksen, opened on 23 May 1993, the same day the old station and Jong were closed. The old station was demolished in 1996.

Facilities

Slependen Station is situated on the Drammen Line,  from Oslo Central Station. It is situated in a mostly residential area next to a steep slope. Access to the platform from the steep side is via a rotunda, which features a circular ramp and stairs. This is connected to the staircase on the platform via an overpass, as is access from the other side of the tracks. These are built in untreated concrete, although ceilings and walls are clad in pine. The station has parking for 80 cars.

Service
Vy serves Slependen with line L1 of the Oslo Commuter Rail. L1 calls at all stations, running from Spikkestad Station along the Spikkestad Line to Asker Station and past Slependen to Oslo Central Station. It then continues along the Trunk Line to Lillestrøm Station. Slependen has two trains per direction per hour, which is scheduled to increase to four in late 2014. The station had about 900 daily passengers in 2008. Travel time to Oslo Central Station is 21 minutes.

References

Railway stations in Bærum
Railway stations on the Drammen Line
Railway stations opened in 1873
1873 establishments in Norway